Mohammed Alibhai is a businessman in Uganda. According to a 2007 published report in the New Vision newspaper, he was one of the wealthiest individuals in Uganda.

Businesses and investments
His holdings include bodyguards, security guards, and real estate investments.

See also
List of wealthiest people in Uganda

References

Living people
People from Kampala District
Ugandan businesspeople
Year of birth missing (living people)
Place of birth missing (living people)